Lascelina is a genus of snout moths described by Carl Heinrich in 1956.

Species
 Lascelina canens Heinrich, 1956
 Lascelina cordobensis (Neunzig, 2002)
 Lascelina papillina Neunzig & Solis, 2002
 Lascelina pitilla Neunzig & Solis, 2002

References

Phycitinae
Pyralidae genera
Taxa named by Carl Heinrich